Church Street–Congress Street Historic District is a national historic district located in the village of Moravia in Cayuga County, New York.  The district contains 122 contributing buildings and one contributing structure.  It is primarily a residential district and preserves several intact examples from the village's earliest period of development, 1810–1830. Numerous residential structures date to the 1830–1840 period and are in the Greek Revival style. This includes the Federal style Congregational Church (1823). Other churches located in the district are the Romanesque style Baptist Church (1874) and the Gothic Revival St. Matthew's Episcopal Church (1897–1898).  The district also includes the Powers Library (1880) building and Moravia High School (1924).

It was listed on the National Register of Historic Places in 1994.

Selected contributing properties are:
U.S. Post Office (1940-41), South Main Street, WPA brick building.
St. Matthew's Episcopal Church (1897-1898), 16 Church St.  A clapboarded frame church with a corner tower.  Has noncontributing church school addition, built c.1960.
Powers Library (1880), with Romanesque Revival style for its front, brick building
First Congregational Church (1823), now Christ United Methodist Church, Federal in style with three-stage bell tower
First Baptist Church (1874), 37 Church Street, brick Romanesque Revival building, expanded in 1891
Jewett Mansion (c.1870), 30 Church Street, Second Empire mansion with c.1870 carriage house
35 Congress Street (1875), Italianate
Former Moravia High School (1924)

Notes

References

External links

Moravia (village), New York
Historic districts on the National Register of Historic Places in New York (state)
Historic districts in Cayuga County, New York
National Register of Historic Places in Cayuga County, New York